The Vlaamse Televisie Sterren (Dutch for "Flemish Television Stars") are Flemish television awards, in fifteen categories. Winners are announced during an annual television show called Night of the Flemish Television Stars (Dutch: Nacht van de Vlaamse Televisie Sterren), which is an Oscar-style gala organised by the Flemish Television Academy (Vlaamse Televisie Academie). Each year categories are evaluated and adapted to the ever-changing trends of television if needed.

Every ceremony is aired on television. The rights to the ceremony are shared by the two leading television stations in Flanders: public television station Eén and commercial station vtm.  The show is co-hosted, but broadcast by only one of the two aforementioned channels in turn.  The most recent ceremony was held on the second of March 2013 and aired by vtm.  Night of the Flemish Television Stars first aired in 2008 and is a follow up to Het Gala van het Gouden Oog (Gala of the Golden Eye), which was last broadcast in 1998.

Categories 
The public votes by means of internet and televoting for the following categories:
 Most Popular Television Personality
 Most Popular Television Program
Members of the academy's Board of Management vote for:
 the "Rising Star", for the best newcomer to Flemish television.
 the "Career Star", to honor someone's outstanding career in Flemish television.
The other categories are voted for by members of the academy:
 Best Actor
 Best Actress
 Best male Presenter
 Best female Presenter
 Best Drama
 Best Reality Show
 Best Entertaining Show
 Best Lifestyle Program
 Best Comedy Show
 Best Documentary Program
 Best Informative Program

Voting procedure 
Voting in the last categories proceeds in two steps:
 Members of the academy nominate four favorites in each category. These results are processed into a general shortlist with 4 nominations in each category.
 In a second round of voting Academy members choose their personal favorites from the shortlist, in each category. The personality or program with the most votes wins the Vlaamse Televisie Ster.

Nominations and winners 
NOTE: certain categories have been adjusted, added or cancelled over the years.

Best Actor and Actress
Note: In 2008 the categories Best Actor and Best Actress were combined, with Veerle Baetens being awarded Best Actor/Actress.

Best Male Presenter and Female Presenter
Note: In 2008 the categories Best Male Presenter and Best Female Presenter were combined, however no female presenters were nominated for the award.

External links
Official website

Belgian television awards